The Guàrdia Urbana (English: Urban Guard) is the municipal police force for the city of Barcelona, Catalonia, Spain.

History 
Originally it was formed in November 1843 as the "Municipal Guard". Although in 1907 it became the "Urban Guard".

Originally their police officers were armed with a sabre, pistol, and a rifle. Following Tragic Week events in 1909 the force was demilitarized, and officers are now armed with sidearms for personal defence.

During the early 20th century the force based their uniform types around that of the British Police uniform. The emergency contact number is 092.

Equipment

Police officers carry long batons, Walther P99 pistols and PDAs.

Ranks
Constable
Senior Constable
Sergeant
Sub-inspector
Inspector
Chief Inspector
Sub-superintendent
Superintendent

Vehicles

Primarily Toyota Prius V; previously Citroën, SEAT Altea XL and SEAT Toledo patrol cars 
Renault Trafic and Citroën Jumpy vans
Nissan Pathfinder 4WD vehicles
Honda F 250 and Piaggio scooters
Polaris dune buggies
Yamaha XT 600 E (off-road) and Honda ST1300 E (traffic policing) motorbikes

See also 
Mossos d'Esquadra
Corps of Firefighters of Catalonia

References

External links 
Official website (English)
 (Catalan)
Official website (Spanish)

1907 establishments in Catalonia
Government agencies established in 1907
Government of Barcelona
Municipal law enforcement agencies of Spain